Nikola Hajdin (Serbian Cyrillic: Никола Хајдин; 4 April 1923 – 17 July 2019) was a Serbian construction engineer, professor and the president of the Serbian Academy of Sciences and Arts,  as a member of the Department of Technical Sciences.

Biography
As a construction engineer, he built many bridges in Yugoslavia; most prominently the New Railway Bridge in Belgrade and the Liberty Bridge in Novi Sad. Nikola Hajdin also designed the bridge which was built in 2007 in Poland - the Solidarity Bridge in Płock over the Vistula river.

Hajdin was professor of the University of Belgrade Faculty of Civil Engineering. He held masters and doctoral degrees from the same school (his mentor was professor Jakov Hlitčijev). He was also a member of the European Academy of Sciences and Arts, Slovenian Academy of Sciences and Arts and other organisations.

Hajdin stated in an interview that the controversial SANU Memorandum was never the official document of the Academy and that it did containt anything malicious.

References

1923 births
2019 deaths
Serbian engineers
University of Belgrade Faculty of Civil Engineering alumni
Academic staff of the University of Belgrade
Members of the Serbian Academy of Sciences and Arts
Members of the European Academy of Sciences and Arts
People from Vrbovsko
Serbs of Croatia
Yugoslav engineers